Laurent Munier (born 30 September 1966 in Lyon) is a French handball player who competed in the 1992 Summer Olympics.

In 1992 he was a member of the French handball team which won the bronze medal. He played all seven matches and scored 26 goals.

External links
profile

1966 births
Living people
French male handball players
Olympic handball players of France
Handball players at the 1992 Summer Olympics
Olympic bronze medalists for France
Olympic medalists in handball
Medalists at the 1992 Summer Olympics